The 2021 Gardner–Webb Runnin' Bulldogs football team represented Gardner–Webb University as a member of the Big South Conference during the 2021 NCAA Division I FCS football season. Led by second-year head coach Tre Lamb, the Runnin' Bulldogs played their home games at the Ernest W. Spangler Stadium in Boiling Springs, North Carolina.

Schedule

References

Gardner-Webb
Gardner–Webb Runnin' Bulldogs football seasons
Gardner-Webb Runnin' Bulldogs football